Alut District is a district (bakhsh) in Baneh County, Kurdistan Province, Iran. At the 2006 census, its population was 10,394, in 1,975 families.  The District has one city: Armardeh.  The District has two rural districts (dehestan): Beleh Keh Rural District and Posht-e Arbaba Rural District.

References 

Baneh County
Districts of Kurdistan Province